Leo Charles Opray (13 August 1909 – 8 February 1974) was an Australian rules footballer who played with Carlton in the Victorian Football League (VFL).

Opray played in the seconds for Richmond in 1929 and from there went to Oakleigh, where he was a member of their 1930 and 1931 premierships sides.

He joined Carlton in 1932 and was a wingman in their grand final team that year, which lost to his former club, Richmond. He subsequently played with Coburg, Murtoa and Brighton.

Opray later served in the Australian Army during World War II.

References

1909 births
Australian rules footballers from Melbourne
Carlton Football Club players
Oakleigh Football Club players
Coburg Football Club players
Brighton Football Club players

1974 deaths
People from Richmond, Victoria
Australian Army personnel of World War II
Military personnel from Melbourne